Marcia Alejandra Garbey Montell (born 9 February 1949) is a Cuban athlete. She competed in the women's long jump at the 1968 Summer Olympics and the 1972 Summer Olympics.

References

1949 births
Living people
Athletes (track and field) at the 1968 Summer Olympics
Athletes (track and field) at the 1972 Summer Olympics
Cuban female long jumpers
Olympic athletes of Cuba
Athletes (track and field) at the 1967 Pan American Games
Athletes (track and field) at the 1971 Pan American Games
Athletes (track and field) at the 1975 Pan American Games
Pan American Games gold medalists for Cuba
Pan American Games medalists in athletics (track and field)
Sportspeople from Santiago de Cuba
Central American and Caribbean Games gold medalists for Cuba
Competitors at the 1970 Central American and Caribbean Games
Competitors at the 1974 Central American and Caribbean Games
Central American and Caribbean Games medalists in athletics
Medalists at the 1967 Pan American Games
20th-century Cuban women